Line 1 of the Zhengzhou Metro is a rapid transit line running from west to east Zhengzhou. It opened on the 28 December 2013. This line is currently 41.2 km long with 30 stations.

Opening timeline
Phase 1 of Line 1 opened on 28 December 2013.

Phase 2 of Line 1 opened on 12 January 2017 extending terminals on both ends with additional seven stations (9.65 km) on the western end and two stations (5.36 km) on the eastern end.

Stations

References

 
Railway lines opened in 2013
2013 establishments in China
Zhengzhou Metro lines